HNLMS Rotterdam (D818) was a destroyer of the . The ship was in service with the Royal Netherlands Navy from 1957 to 1981. The destroyer was named after the Dutch city of Rotterdam and was the nineteenth ship with this name. In 1981 the ship was taken out of service and sold to Peru where it was  renamed Diez Canseco. The ship's radio call sign was "PAFQ".

Dutch service history
HNLMS Rotterdam was one of eight s and was built at the RDM in Rotterdam. The keel laying took place on 7 January 1954 and the launching on 26 January 1956. The ship was put into service on 28 February 1957.

Rotterdam towed  to the harbor after a fire had broken out in that ships engine room on 12 November 1980. Two crewman of the Drenthe died during the fire and four were injured. The fire was caused by an attempt to burn paper in the engine room. That day Drenthe was in the Caribbean to relieve Rotterdam as station ship.

On 15 May 1981 the vessel was decommissioned and sold to the Peruvian Navy.

Peruvian service history

The ship was put into service on 29 June 1981 where the ship was renamed Diez Canseco and decommissioned in 1991.

Notes

Friesland-class destroyers
1956 ships
Ships built in Rotterdam
Destroyers of the Cold War